This list includes notable professors and students of the Académie Julian, a private art school in Paris founded by Rodolphe Julian that was active from 1867 to 1968.

Notable professors

Notable students

Notes

References

 
 
Arts in France
People by educational institution in France
Art schools in Paris
Lists of people by university or college in France